Gluteal nerve may refer to:
 Superior gluteal nerve
 Inferior gluteal nerve